Yaqutin-e Jadid (also Romanized as Yāqūtīn-e Jadīd; also known as Yāqūtīn, Yāqūtain, and Yāqūtī) is a village in Jamrud Rural District, in the Central District of Torbat-e Jam County, Razavi Khorasan Province, Iran. At the 2006 census, its population was 2,488, in 557 families.

References 

Populated places in Torbat-e Jam County